Sancho Alfonso of Castile (1342–1374), known in Spanish as Don Sancho Alfonso de Castilla, was Infante of Castile, 1st Count of Alburquerque.

He was the ninth of the ten illegitimate children of Alfonso XI of Castile and Leonor de Guzmán.

He was born in Seville. He participated in a revolt of the Castilian nobles against the despotic rule of his brother, Peter of Castile.

In 1373 he married Beatrice of Portugal, daughter of Peter I of Portugal and Inês de Castro. They had two children: Fernando Sánchez, 2nd Count of Alburquerque, and Eleanor of Alburquerque, who married Ferdinand I of Aragon.

He also had an illegitimate daughter, Leonor Sánchez de Castilla, who had a liaison with her first cousin Fadrique de Castilla, 1st Duke of Benavente, illegitimate son of Henry II of Castile with mistress Beatriz Ponce de León.

Ancestors

References 

 Francisco de Moxó y de Montoliu, Estudios sobre las relaciones entre Aragón y Castilla, 1997, 

1342 births
1375 deaths
People from Seville
14th-century Castilians
Counts of Spain
Spanish people of Portuguese descent
Spanish people of Italian descent
Castilian House of Burgundy
Sons of kings